This is a list of current and former lighthouses in Oregon.

See also 

 Lists of Oregon-related topics

References

External links 

 Illustrated map showing location, range, photos, height, visiting hours, etc.

 
Oregon
Lighthouses
Lighthouses
Lighthouses